Dolac is a small place in Croatia located between Primošten and Bilo. The main economic activity is tourism.

References

Populated places in Šibenik-Knin County